The 2012–13 Turkish Women's Volleyball League,   was the annual season of the country's highest volleyball level and was conquered for 7th time in a row by VakıfBank S.K.

Teams
 VakıfBank
 Eczacıbaşı VitrA
 Galatasaray Daikin
 Fenerbahçe
 Beşiktaş Bahçeşehir Üni.
 Bursa Büyükşehir Bld.
 Sarıyer Bld
 Yeşilyurt
 Nilüfer Belediyesi
 İBA TED Ankara Kolejliler
 Ereğli Belediye
 İlbank

Regular season

<div align=left>

– YLP : Young League Point

Individual awards

References

2012 in Turkish sport
2013 in Turkish sport
2012 in Turkish women's sport
2013 in Turkish women's sport
Turkish Women's Volleyball League seasons